Lisbon Falls, Maine is a CDP in the town of Lisbon, Maine, United States of America.

Lisbon Falls may also refer to:

Lisbon Falls (waterfall), a waterfall in Mpumalanga, South Africa
 Lisbon Falls High School, in Lisbon, Maine

See also
 Lisbon (disambiguation)